Ivana Zemanová (née Bednarčíková; born 29 April 1965) is the former First Lady of the Czech Republic and wife of the 3rd President of the Czech Republic Miloš Zeman.

References

1965 births
Living people
First ladies of the Czech Republic
People from Nové Město na Moravě
20th-century Czech economists
Czech women economists
Miloš Zeman